Mahir Oral (born 23 May 1980) is a German professional boxer.

Personal life
Mahir Oral was born in Hamburg, West Germany on 23 May 1980.

Boxing career
Oral competed in professional boxing from early 2000 through February 2011. He is classified as a middleweight boxer with an orthodox stance. Since 4 March 2000, Oral has competed in 34 professional boxing bouts (winning 28), totalling 195 rounds, with a knockout rate of 32.35 percent:

Professional bouts

Title bouts

References

External links
 

1980 births
German male boxers
living people
middleweight boxers
sportspeople from Hamburg